William Windsor Parker (5 May 1832 – 17 July 1873) was an English cricketer. He played nine first-class matches for Oxford University Cricket Club between 1852 and 1860.

He was the son of Windsor Parker and was educated at Rugby School and Merton College, Oxford, where he matriculated in 1850, and graduated B.A. in 1855. He studied law and was called to the bar at Lincoln's Inn in 1861.

See also
 List of Oxford University Cricket Club players

References

External links
 

1832 births
1873 deaths
English cricketers
Oxford University cricketers
People from Mhow
People educated at Rugby School
Alumni of Merton College, Oxford
English barristers
Gentlemen of the North cricketers
19th-century English lawyers